Borislav Ananiev (born December 11, 1955) is a Bulgarian sprint canoer who competed from the mid-1970s to the early 1980s. Competing in two Summer Olympics, he won a bronze medal in the C-2 500 m event at Moscow in 1980.

Ananiev also won a bronze medal in the C-1 500 m event at the 1975 ICF Canoe Sprint World Championships in Belgrade.

References

Sports-reference.com profile

1955 births
Bulgarian male canoeists
Canoeists at the 1976 Summer Olympics
Canoeists at the 1980 Summer Olympics
Living people
Olympic canoeists of Bulgaria
Olympic bronze medalists for Bulgaria
Olympic medalists in canoeing
ICF Canoe Sprint World Championships medalists in Canadian
Medalists at the 1980 Summer Olympics